Chronicle of a Blood Merchant is a 2015 South Korean film adaptation of the bestselling 1995 Chinese novel of the same title by Yu Hua. The film, set in 1950s Korea, was co-written and directed by Ha Jung-woo, and he also starred alongside Ha Ji-won.

Plot
Set in a village right after the Korean War, poor but good-hearted Heo Sam-gwan sets out to win the most beautiful girl in the village, Heo Ok-ran, by selling his blood to earn money. Years later, the two are happily married with three children, but their family undergoes a crisis when Sam-gwan's eldest son doesn't resemble him and rumors spread about the boy's paternity.

Cast

Ha Jung-woo as Heo Sam-gwan
Ha Ji-won as Heo Ok-ran
Nam Da-reum as Heo Il-rak
Noh Kang-min as Heo Yi-rak
Cheon Hyeon-seok as Heo Sam-rak
Jeon Hye-jin as Ms. Song
Jang Gwang as Mr. Choi
Min Moo-je as Ha So-yong
Joo Jin-mo as Uncle
Sung Dong-il as Mr. Bang
Jung Man-sik as Mr. Shim 
Cho Jin-woong as Mr. Ahn
Kim Sung-kyun as Geun-ryong
Kim Jae-young as Mr. Jo
Lee Ji-hoon as Mr. Gye
Kim Young-ae as Gye-hwa's mother
Lee Geung-young as Ok-ran's father
Kim Byung-ok
Jung Ui-kap as Ascetic Moon
Choi Kyu-hwan as Postman
Kim Gi-cheon as Elder Dae-ji
Min Kyeong-jin as Elder Jang-ki
Jo Seon-mook as Restaurant owner
Hwang Bo-ra as Gye-hwa
Lee Seung-joon  as Dongdaemun Jeil hospital security guard 1
Yoon Eun-hye as Im Boon-bang (cameo)

Box office
The film opened on January 15, 2015, placing fourth at the South Korean box office. It grossed  from 582,000 admissions in its first five days.

Awards and nominations

References

External links
 

2015 films
Films based on Chinese novels
South Korean drama films
2015 drama films
Films set in the 1950s
Films set in Korea
Next Entertainment World films
2010s South Korean films